Leche asada (literally "roasted milk") is a dessert from Peru, Colombia, and Chile. It is similar to flan because it is made with the same ingredients, but 'leche asada' has a less smooth texture and is baked directly, which creates a toasted layer on the surface

References

External links
 

South American cuisine
Puddings